Tianma (天馬) is the Chinese mythological version of the pegasus.

Tianma may also refer to:

 Tianma Tea House, Datong, Taipei, Taiwan
 Shanghai Tianma Circuit, the Tianma motor racing circuit of Shanghai, China
 Gansu Tianma, the Tianma soccer club from Gansu, China
 Tianma Wan, a traditional Chinese medicine
 Sky Horse, a Taiwanese ballistic missile
 Baolong Pegasus, a Chinese MPV-minivan

See also

 Tianma chafang (disambiguation)
 Tian (disambiguation)
 Ma (disambiguation)